K 2.0 is the fifth studio album by English psychedelic raga rock band Kula Shaker. Recorded in 2015 at State Of The Ark, London, England and The Tea Rooms, Lompret, Belgium. Released on 12 February 2016 on CD, vinyl and digital download.

Track listing

Bonus track

Charts

References

2016 albums
Kula Shaker albums